Sonny Ramaswamy (born 1952) is an Indian American agricultural scientist and current President and CEO of Northwest Commission on Colleges and Universities. He formerly served as Director of the National Institute of Food and Agriculture.

Early life and education
Sonny Ramaswamy was born in Hyderabad, India, and grew up in Bangalore as the youngest of four boys. He graduated from St. Joseph’s Indian High School, a Jesuit school in Bangalore, and later, from the University of Agricultural Sciences, Bangalore, with a Bachelor of Science in Agriculture in 1973 and a Master of Science (Agriculture) in entomology in 1976. He then earned his Ph.D. in 1980 in entomology from Rutgers University. Following, Dr. Ramaswamy undertook postdoctoral research on the sex pheromone of insects from 1980-1982 in Ring Cardé’s laboratory at Michigan State University. In 2001, Dr. Ramaswamy completed Harvard University's executive Management Development Program.

Career
Dr. Ramaswamy served as professor of insect physiology and graduate program coordinator in the Department of Entomology at Mississippi State University from 1982-1997. He then served as University Distinguished Professor and Head of the Department of Entomology at Kansas State University from 1997 to 2005. In 2002, Dr. Ramaswamy received the Presidential Award for Outstanding Department Head. He envisioned and created the K-State Insect Zoo, a hands-on educational and fun destination.

Dr. Ramaswamy’s personal research was funded with grants from federal agencies, including NIFA, NSF, NIH, EPA, and USAID, and from state agencies, commodity groups and industry. He has published over 150 journal articles, book chapters, a book, and has a patent, and is the recipient of several awards and honors, including Fellow of the American Association for the Advancement of Science, Fellow of the Entomological Society of America, the Hutchinson Medal from the Chicago Botanic Garden and Leader in Agriculture Award from Agriculture Future of America. Dr. Ramaswamy has mentored numerous high school, undergraduate and graduate students, along with postdoctorates, visiting professors and staff in non-governmental, governmental and private sector organizations.

Between 2006 and 2009, Dr. Ramaswamy directed Purdue University's agricultural research programs, facilitating success on numerous grant-funded projects in support of multi- and trans-disciplinary research and education projects on bioenergy, climate change, water, agroecology, and food security and production agriculture.

In 2009, Dr. Ramaswamy moved to Oregon State University to serve as dean of the College of Agricultural Sciences and director of the Oregon Agricultural Experiment Station. He worked with stakeholders to mitigate the severity of state budget cuts because of the Great Recession. He also facilitated the development of the College’s strategic direction and restructuring. Capitalizing on the College’s strength in enology and viticulture, brewing, and cheese making, he crafted a vision to focus on innovations in fermentation, including creation of the Beaver Classic cheese, beer, wine, bread and other products produced by students as they developed experiential knowledge and skills. Dr. Ramaswamy also envisioned and created the Leadership Academy.

On May 7, 2012, President Barack Obama appointed Dr. Ramaswamy to serve as director of the United States Department of Agriculture’s National Institute of Food and Agriculture (NIFA). NIFA catalyzes transformative discoveries, education and engagement to solve societal and agricultural challenges. As director, Dr. Ramaswamy oversaw NIFA's research portfolio of nearly $1.6 billion in funding for a wide range of extramural research, education and extension projects to address challenges related to food security, nutrition and childhood obesity, food safety, climate change, water, bioenergy, human sciences, and youth, family and communities. Dr. Ramaswamy was a passionate proponent of diversity and inclusiveness, particularly support of Tribal and Historically Black Land-Grant Colleges. He provided the vision to create and deploy innovative grant opportunities to promote the success and profitability of farming, development and deployment of smart systems, robotics, “internet of agricultural things”, sensors, drones and Big Data. Dr. Ramaswamy also provided the vision for and promoted the development and deployment of grant funds to revitalize the education and nurturing of American food and agricultural workforce with both technical and leadership skills. Ramaswamy facilitated collaborations with other federal agencies such as the National Science Foundation (NSF), National Institutes of Health (NIH), Defense Advanced Research Projects Agency (DARPA), Advanced Research Projects Agency-Energy (ARPA-E), Department of Defense, Department of Veterans Affairs Veterans, Environmental Protection Agency (EPA), Substance Abuse and Mental Health Services Administration (SAMHSA) and private and non-governmental organizations.

Dr. Ramaswamy is an avid proponent of food, agriculture and science in general, constantly appearing on numerous panels, interviews in the media and speaking at schools, colleges, and institutions and organizations across America. He also promotes entomophagy, and has appeared in a number of documentaries about insects for food and feed, including The Gateway Bug and Bugs on the Menu.

Family and personal life
Dr. Ramaswamy is married to Gita Ramaswamy who previously served as professor of textiles, administrator and senior advisor to USDA’s chief scientist. Their daughter Megha Ramaswamy is a professor of population health at University of Kansas Medical Center; Megha, her husband Andrew Park, emergency room physician at University of Kansas Medical Center Hospital, and their son Siddhartha reside in Kansas City, MO.

Dr. Ramaswamy has been active in community and university theaters, Habitat for Humanity and enjoys riding his Harley-Davidson motorcycle.

References

External links

 Official Curriculum Vitae
 Sonny Ramaswamy Chosen to Head NIFA
 Obama appoints Indian Americans to key administration posts
 OSU dean to lead top food and agriculture agency

1952 births
Living people
Indian agriculturalists
American people of Indian descent
United States Department of Agriculture officials
American agriculturalists